"Wir brauchen... Werner" (We need... Werner) is a song recorded for the film "Werner – Beinhart!", which is the first film made about the German comics hero Werner. Die Ärzte was supposed to record it and the song was supposed to be the theme song for the film, however, Die Ärzte was on hiatus in the time and the song was instead recorded by Die Ärzte's members Bela B. and Farin Urlaub a.k.a. Jan; the song became the end credits song and didn't do well on charts.

The longer version is also on the soundtrack; the shorter version is only on the single, it's also more lively. Also, "Hau wech" was on the soundtrack.

Track listing

7" single

 Bela B. & Jan: "Wir brauchen... Werner" (Felsenheimer/Vetter) – 3:47
 The F....' Kius Band: "Hau wech" (Peter Thomsen) – 3:16

Maxi

 Bela B. & Jan: "Wir brauchen... Werner" (Felsenheimer/Vetter) – 5:55
 The F....' Kius Band: "Hau wech" (Peter Thomsen) – 3:16
 Bela B. & Jan: "Wir brauchen... Werner" (Felsenheimer/Vetter) – 3:47

Personnel
Bela B. - vocals (verses), drums
Farin Urlaub - vocals (chorus), guitar, bass

1990 singles
Bela B. songs
Songs written by Bela B.
Farin Urlaub songs
Songs written by Farin Urlaub
1990 songs
Polydor Records singles